Désirée Leupold (born 11 November 1972) is an Austrian former professional tennis player.

Leupold played on the professional tour in the 1990s and reached a best singles ranking of 375 in the world. She featured in four WTA Tour main draws as a doubles player, otherwise spending her career on the ITF Circuit.

ITF finals

Singles: 2 (0–2)

Doubles: 5 (0–5)

References

External links
 
 

1972 births
Living people
Austrian female tennis players
20th-century Austrian women